Shane Osborn (born June 21, 1974) is an American politician and naval aviator who served as the 42nd Nebraska State Treasurer from 2007 to 2011. He is a member of the Republican Party. He was the U.S. pilot during the Hainan Island incident.

Military career

Osborn graduated from Norfolk High School in 1992 and then attended the University of Nebraska–Lincoln on a Naval ROTC scholarship. After graduating in 1996 with a degree in statistics and actuarial science, Osborn was commissioned as an ensign in the United States Navy and entered flight training in Florida and Texas.  Subsequently designated as a naval aviator, he was eventually assigned to the Fleet Air Reconnaissance Squadron One (VQ-1) "World Watchers" at NAS Whidbey Island, Washington, flying the EP-3E Aries aircraft.

On April 1, 2001, then-Lieutenant Osborn was an Electronic Warfare Aircraft Commander piloting an EP-3E aircraft with a 23-member crew near Chinese airspace when a Chinese J-8IIM jet fighter that had intercepted the U.S. aircraft collided with the EP-3E. The EP-3E's propeller cut the J-8 in half and its pilot was killed. The fighter's nose section cartwheeled upward, smashing into the EP-3E's nose and tearing off its radome. The impact sent the EP-3 plane into an inverted dive, dropping 8,000 feet in 30 seconds and falling another 6,000 feet before Osborn had the EP-3E's nose up and wings level. In a September 2003 article in the Naval Aviation News, Osborn told Jim Turnbull that once he regained control of the plane he "called for the crew to prepare to bail out." They donned parachutes and initiated an emergency destruct plan, which included destroying intelligence equipment and sensitive documents on board.

After an emergency landing at the Lingshui Air Base on Hainan Island, Osborn and his crew were taken to a Chinese military barracks where they were detained and interrogated for 12 days.  The aircraft was dismantled by American engineers after much negotiation between the countries and returned to the US in boxes after months of scrutiny by Chinese officials.  On April 12, 2001 the crew were released from Chinese custody and returned to the United States. After the Hainan Island incident, Osborn was awarded the Distinguished Flying Cross.

In 2005, Osborn left the Regular Navy as a Lieutenant Commander after nine years of active duty and entered the Navy Reserve.

Political career

State treasurer
In 2006, Osborn won the Republican nomination for the office of Nebraska State Treasurer by defeating Republican incumbent Ron Ross, who had been appointed to the position on January 6, 2004 by Governor Mike Johanns. In the primary election, Osborn received 148,355 votes to Ross's 85,541, for a 63.4%–36.6% victory.  In the general election, Osborn obtained 410,459 votes to Nebraska Party candidate John H. Gaithings's 127,586 votes, winning 76.3%–23.7%.

In 2007, the Aspen Institute selected Osborn to be a part of their Aspen-Rodell Fellows Program in Public Leadership and was also elected Vice President of the National Association of Unclaimed Property Administrators.
He is also a shareholder with the SilverStone Group, a financial services firm in Omaha, Nebraska.

During his tenure in office, Osborn reduced the state treasurer's budget by 12.8 percent.

In September 2009, Osborn announced he would not seek re-election for Nebraska State Treasurer.

2014 U.S. Senate campaign

On June 2, 2013, Osborn announced that he would seek election to the U.S. Senate from Nebraska, after incumbent Senator Mike Johanns announced that he would retire after one term. Osborn lost the May 13, 2014, primary to Ben Sasse.

References

External links
Shane Osborn for U.S. Senate
 
Candidate profile at Our Campaigns
 Aviation consultant profile] at SilverStone Group

1974 births
American Lutherans
Aviators from South Dakota
Living people
Nebraska Republicans
People from Davison County, South Dakota
People from Norfolk, Nebraska
Recipients of the Distinguished Flying Cross (United States)
State treasurers of Nebraska
United States Navy officers
Writers from Nebraska
University of Nebraska alumni
United States Naval Aviators